This is a list of foreign ministers in 1999.

Africa
 Algeria -
Ahmed Attaf (1996-1999)
Youcef Yousfi (1999-2000)
 Angola -
Venâncio da Silva Moura (1992-1999)
João Bernardo de Miranda (1999-2008)
 Benin - Antoine Idji Kolawolé (1998-2003)
 Botswana - Mompati Merafhe (1994-2008)
 Burkina Faso -
Ablassé Ouedraogo (1994-1999)
Youssouf Ouedraogo (1999-2007)
 Burundi -  Severin Ntahomvukiye (1998-2001)
 Cameroon - Augustin Kontchou Kouomegni (1997-2001)
 Cape Verde - José Luís de Jesus (1998-2000)
 Central African Republic -
Jean-Mette Yapende (1997-1999)
Marcel Metefara (1999-2001)
 Chad - Mahamat Saleh Annadif (1997-2003)
 Comoros -
Nidhoim Attoumane (1998-1999)
Mohamed El-Amine Souef (1999-2002)
 Republic of Congo - Rodolphe Adada (1997-2007)
 Democratic Republic of Congo -
Jean-Charles Okoto (1998-1999)
Abdoulaye Yerodia Ndombasi (1999-2000)
 Côte d'Ivoire - Amara Essy (1990-2000)
 Djibouti -
Mohamed Moussa Chehem (1995-1999)
Ali Abdi Farah (1999-2005)
 Egypt - Amr Moussa (1991-2001)
 Equatorial Guinea -
Miguel Oyono Ndong Mifumu (1993-1999)
Santiago Nsobeya Efuman (1999-2003)
 Eritrea - Haile Woldetensae (1997-2000)
 Ethiopia - Seyoum Mesfin (1991-2010)
 Gabon -
Casimir Oyé-Mba (1994-1999)
Jean Ping (1999-2008)
 The Gambia - Momodou Lamin Sedat Jobe (1998-2001)
 Ghana - Victor Gbeho (1997-2001)
 Guinea -
Lamine Camara (1996-1999)
Zainoul Abidine Sanoussy (1999-2000)
 Guinea-Bissau -
Fernando Delfim da Silva (1996-1999)
Hilia Barber (1999)
José Pereira Baptista (1999-2000)
 Kenya - Bonaya Godana (1998-2001)
 Lesotho - Tom Thabane (1998-2002)
 Liberia - Monie Captan (1996-2003)
 Libya - Umar Mustafa al-Muntasir (1992-2000)
 Madagascar - Lila Ratsifandrihamanana (1998-2002)
 Malawi -
Mapopa Chipeta (1997-1999)
Brown Mpinganjira (1999-2000)
 Mali - Modibo Sidibe (1997-2002)
 Mauritania - Ahmed Ould Sid'Ahmed (1998-2001)
 Mauritius - Rajkeswur Purryag (1997-2000)
 Morocco -
Abdellatif Filali (1985-1999)
Mohamed Benaissa (1999-2007)
 Western Sahara - Mohamed Salem Ould Salek (1998–2023)
 Mozambique - Leonardo Simão (1994-2005)
 Namibia - Theo-Ben Gurirab (1990-2002)
 Niger -
Maman Sambo Sidikou (1997-1999)
Aïchatou Mindaoudou (1999-2000)
 Nigeria -
Ignatius Olisemeka (1998-1999)
Sule Lamido (1999-2003)
 Rwanda -
Anastase Gasana (1994-1999)
Amri Sued Ismail (1999)
Augustin Iyamuremye (1999-2000)
 São Tomé and Príncipe -
Homero Jeronimo Salvaterra (1996-1999)
Alberto Paulino (1999)
Paulo Jorge Espirito Santo (1999-2000)
 Senegal - Jacques Baudin (1998-2000)
 Seychelles - Jérémie Bonnelame (1997-2005)
 Sierra Leone - Sama Banya (1998-2001)
 Somalia - no central government
 Somaliland - Mahmud Salah Nur (1997-2001)
 South Africa -
Alfred Baphethuxolo Nzo (1994-1999)
Nkosazana Dlamini-Zuma (1999-2009)
 Sudan - Mustafa Osman Ismail (1998-2005)
 Swaziland - Albert Nhlanhla Shabangu (1998-2001)
 Tanzania - Jakaya Kikwete (1995-2006)
 Togo - Joseph Kokou Koffigoh (1998-2000)
 Tunisia -
Said Ben Mustapha (1997-1999)
Habib Ben Yahia (1999-2004)
 Uganda - Eriya Kategaya (1996-2001)
 Zambia - Keli Walubita (1997-2002)
 Zimbabwe - Stan Mudenge (1995-2005)

Asia
 Afghanistan -
Mullah Mohammad Hassan (1998-1999)
Wakil Ahmed Muttawakil (1999-2001)
 Armenia - Vartan Oskanian (1998-2008)
 Azerbaijan -
Tofig Zulfugarov (1998-1999)
Vilayat Guliyev (1999-2004)
 Nagorno-Karabakh - Naira Melkumyan (1997-2002)
 Bahrain - Sheikh Muhammad ibn Mubarak ibn Hamad Al Khalifah (1971-2005)
 Bangladesh - Abdus Samad Azad (1996-2001)
 Bhutan - Jigme Thinley (1998-2003)
 Brunei - Pengiran Muda Mohamed Bolkiah (1984–2015)
 Cambodia - Hor Namhong (1998–2016)
 China - Tang Jiaxuan (1998-2003)
 Georgia - Irakli Menagarishvili (1995-2003)
 Abkhazia - Sergei Shamba (1997-2004)
 South Ossetia - Murat Dzhioyev (1998-2012)
 India - Jaswant Singh (1998-2002)
 Indonesia -
Ali Alatas (1988-1999)
Alwi Shihab (1999-2001)
 Iran - Kamal Kharazi (1997-2005)
 Iraq - Muhammad Saeed al-Sahhaf (1992-2001)
 Israel -
Ariel Sharon (1998-1999)
David Levy (1999-2000)
 Japan -
Masahiko Kōmura (1998-1999)
Yōhei Kōno (1999-2001)
 Jordan - Abdul Ilah Khatib (1998-2002)
 Kazakhstan -
Kassym-Jomart Tokayev (1994-1999)
Erlan Idrisov (1999-2002)
 North Korea - Paek Nam-sun (1998-2007)
 South Korea - Hong Soon-young (1998-2000)
 Kuwait - Sheikh Sabah Al-Ahmad Al-Jaber Al-Sabah (1978-2003)
 Kyrgyzstan - Muratbek Imanaliyev (1997-2002)
 Laos - Somsavat Lengsavad (1993-2006)
 Lebanon - Selim al-Hoss (1998-2000)
 Malaysia -
Abdullah Ahmad Badawi (1991-1999)
Syed Hamid Albar (1999-2008)
 Maldives - Fathulla Jameel (1978-2005)
 Mongolia - Nyam-Osoryn Tuyaa (1998-2000)
 Myanmar - Win Aung (1998-2004)
 Nepal -
Girija Prasad Koirala (1998-1999)
Krishna Prasad Bhattarai (1999)
Ram Sharan Mahat (1999-2000)
 Oman - Yusuf bin Alawi bin Abdullah (1982–2020)
 Pakistan -
Sartaj Aziz (1998-1999)
Abdul Sattar (1999-2002)
 Philippines - Domingo Siazon, Jr. (1995-2001)
 Qatar - Sheikh Hamad bin Jassim bin Jaber Al Thani (1992-2013)
 Saudi Arabia - Prince Saud bin Faisal bin Abdulaziz Al Saud (1975–2015)
 Singapore - S. Jayakumar (1994-2004)
 Sri Lanka - Lakshman Kadirgamar (1994-2001)
 Syria - Farouk al-Sharaa (1984-2006)
 Taiwan -
Jason Hu (1997-1999)
Chen Chien-jen (1999-2000)
 Tajikistan - Talbak Nazarov (1994-2006)
 Thailand - Surin Pitsuwan (1997-2001)
 Turkey - İsmail Cem (1997-2002)
 Turkmenistan - Boris Şyhmyradow (1995-2000)
 United Arab Emirates - Rashid Abdullah Al Nuaimi (1980-2006)
 Uzbekistan - Abdulaziz Komilov (1994-2003)
 Vietnam - Nguyễn Mạnh Cầm (1991-2000)
 Yemen - Abdul Qadir Bajamal (1998-2001)

Australia and Oceania
 Australia - Alexander Downer (1996-2007)
 Fiji -
Berenado Vunibobo (1997-1999)
Tupeni Baba (1999-2000)
 Kiribati -  Teburoro Tito (1994-2003)
 Marshall Islands - Phillip H. Muller (1994-2000)
 Micronesia - Epel K. Ilon (1997-2000)
 Nauru -
Bernard Dowiyogo (1998-1999)
René Harris (1999-2000)
 New Zealand -
Don McKinnon (1990-1999)
Phil Goff (1999-2005)
 Cook Islands -
 Inatio Akaruru (1989-1999)
 Joe Williams (1999)
 Robert Woonton (1999-2004)
 Niue - Sani Lakatani (1999-2002)
 Palau - Sabino Anastacio (1997-2000)
 Papua New Guinea -
Roy Yaki (1997-1999)
Sir Michael Somare (1999)
Sir John Kaputin (1999-2000)
 Samoa - Tuilaepa Sailele Malielegaoi (1998–2021)
 Solomon Islands - Patterson Oti (1997-2000)
 Tonga - Prince 'Ulukalala Lavaka Ata (1998-2004)
 Tuvalu -
Bikenibeu Paeniu (1996-1999)
Ionatana Ionatana (1999-2000)
 Vanuatu -
Clement Leo (1998-1999)
Serge Vohor (1999-2001)

Europe
 Albania - Paskal Milo (1997-2001)
 Andorra - Albert Pintat (1997-2001)
 Austria - Wolfgang Schüssel (1995-2000)
 Belarus - Ural Latypov (1998-2000)
 Belgium -
Erik Derycke (1995-1999)
Louis Michel (1999-2004)
 Brussels-Capital Region -
 Jos Chabert (1989-1999)
 Annemie Neyts-Uyttebroeck (1999-2000)
 Flanders -
 Luc Van den Brande (1992-1999)
 Patrick Dewael (1999-2001)
 Wallonia - William Ancion (1996-1999)
 Bosnia and Herzegovina - Jadranko Prlić (1996-2001)
 Bulgaria - Nadezhda Mihailova (1997-2001)
 Croatia - Mate Granić (1993-2000)
 Cyprus - Ioannis Kasoulidis (1997-2003)
 Northern Cyprus - Tahsin Ertuğruloğlu (1998-2004)
 Czech Republic - Jan Kavan (1998-2002)
 Denmark - Niels Helveg Petersen (1993-2000)
 Estonia -
Raul Mälk (1998-1999)
Toomas Hendrik Ilves (1999-2002)
 Finland - Tarja Halonen (1995-2000)
 France - Hubert Védrine (1997-2002)
 Germany - Joschka Fischer (1998-2005)
 Greece -
Theodoros Pangalos (1996-1999)
George Papandreou (1999-2004)
 Hungary - János Martonyi (1998-2002)
 Iceland - Halldór Ásgrímsson (1995-2004)
 Ireland - David Andrews (1997-2000)
 Italy - Lamberto Dini (1996-2001)
 Latvia -
Valdis Birkavs (1994-1999)
Indulis Bērziņš (1999-2002)
 Liechtenstein - Andrea Willi (1993-2001)
 Lithuania - Algirdas Saudargas (1996-2000)
 Luxembourg -
Jacques Poos (1984-1999)
Lydie Polfer (1999-2004)
 Macedonia - Aleksandar Dimitrov (1998-2000)
 Malta -
Guido de Marco (1998-1999)
Joe Borg (1999-2004)
 Moldova - Nicolae Tăbăcaru (1997-2000)
 Netherlands - Jozias van Aartsen (1998-2002)
 Norway - Knut Vollebæk (1997-2000)
 Poland - Bronisław Geremek (1997-2000)
 Portugal - Jaime Gama (1995-2002)
 Romania -
Andrei Pleşu (1997-1999)
Petre Roman (1999-2000)
 Russia - Igor Ivanov (1998-2004)
 Chechnya -
the government went into exile in 2000
 Akhyad Idigov (1998-1999)
 Ilyas Akhmadov (1999-2005)
 San Marino - Gabriele Gatti (1986-2002)
 Slovakia - Eduard Kukan (1998-2006)
 Slovenia - Boris Frlec (1997-2000)
 Spain - Abel Matutes (1996-2000)
 Sweden - Anna Lindh (1998-2003)
 Switzerland -
Flavio Cotti (1993-1999)
Joseph Deiss (1999-2002)
 Ukraine - Borys Tarasyuk (1998-2000)
 United Kingdom - Robin Cook (1997-2001)
 Vatican City - Archbishop Jean-Louis Tauran (1990-2003)
 Yugoslavia - Živadin Jovanović (1998-2000)
 Montenegro - Branko Perović (1997-2000)

North America and the Caribbean
 Antigua and Barbuda - Lester Bird (1991-2004)
 The Bahamas - Janet Bostwick (1994-2002)
 Barbados - Billie Miller (1994-2008)
 Belize - Said Musa (1998-2002)
 Canada - Lloyd Axworthy (1996-2000)
 Quebec - Louise Beaudoin (1998-2003)
 Costa Rica - Roberto Rojas López (1998-2002)
 Cuba -
Roberto Robaina (1993-1999)
Felipe Pérez Roque (1999-2009)
 Dominica - Norris Charles (1998-2000)
 Dominican Republic - Eduardo Latorre Rodríguez (1996-2000)
 El Salvador -
Ramón Ernesto González Giner (1995-1999)
María Eugenia Brizuela de Ávila (1999-2004)
 Grenada -
Mark Isaac (1998-1999)
Keith Mitchell (1999)
Mark Isaac (1999-2000)
 Guatemala - Eduardo Stein (1996-2000)
 Haiti - Fritz Longchamp (1995-2001)
 Honduras -
Fernando Martínez Jiménez (1998-1999)
Roberto Flores Bermúdez (1999-2002)
 Jamaica - Seymour Mullings (1995-2000)
 Mexico - Rosario Green (1998-2000)
 Nicaragua - Eduardo Montealegre (1998-2000)
 Panama -
Jorge Eduardo Ritter (1998-1999)
José Miguel Alemán Healy (1999-2003)
 Puerto Rico – 
Norma Burgos (1995–1999)
Angel Morey (1999–2001)
 Saint Kitts and Nevis - Denzil Douglas (1995-2000)
 Saint Lucia - George Odlum (1997-2001)
 Saint Vincent and the Grenadines - Allan Cruickshank (1998-2001)
 Trinidad and Tobago - Ralph Maraj (1995-2000)
 United States - Madeleine Albright (1997-2001)

South America
 Argentina -
Guido di Tella (1991-1999)
Adalberto Rodríguez Giavarini (1999-2001)
 Bolivia - Javier Murillo de la Rocha (1997-2001)
 Brazil - Luiz Felipe Palmeira Lampreia (1995-2001)
 Chile -
José Miguel Insulza (1994-1999)
Juan Gabriel Valdés (1999-2000)
 Colombia - Guillermo Fernández de Soto (1998-2002)
 Ecuador -
José Ayala Lasso (1997-1999)
Benjamín Ortiz Brennan (1999-2000)
 Guyana - Clement Rohee (1992-2001)
 Paraguay -
Dido Florentin Bogado (1998-1999)
Miguel Abdón Saguier (1999)
José Félix Fernández Estigarribia (1999-2000)
 Peru - Fernando de Trazegnies (1998-2000)
 Suriname - Errol Snijders (1997-2000)
 Uruguay - Didier Opertti (1998-2005)
 Venezuela -
Miguel Ángel Burelli Rivas (1994-1999)
José Vicente Rangel (1999-2001)

1999 in international relations
Foreign ministers
1999